Jeremy Thompson (born 1948) is an English journalist and newsreader.

Jeremy Thompson may also refer to:

 Jeremy Thompson (American football) (born 1985), former American football linebacker
 Jeremy Thompson (cricketer) (born 1963), English cricketer
 Jeremy Thompson (lacrosse) (born 1987), American lacrosse player